Events in the year 1954 in Japan.

Incumbents 
Emperor: Hirohito
Prime minister: Shigeru Yoshida (Liberal Democratic) until December 10, Ichirō Hatoyama (Liberal Democratic)
Chief Cabinet Secretary: Kenji Fukunaga until December 10, Ryutaro Nemoto 
Chief Justice of the Supreme Court: Kōtarō Tanaka
President of the House of Representatives: Yasujirō Tsutsumi until December 10, Tō Matsunaga from December 11
President of the House of Councillors: Yahachi Kawai

Governors
Aichi Prefecture: Mikine Kuwahara 
Akita Prefecture: Tokuji Ikeda 
Aomori Prefecture: Bunji Tsushima
Chiba Prefecture: Hitoshi Shibata 
Ehime Prefecture: Sadatake Hisamatsu 
Fukui Prefecture: Harukazu Obata 
Fukuoka Prefecture: Katsuji Sugimoto 
Fukushima Prefecture: Sakuma Ootake 
Gifu Prefecture: Kamon Muto 
Gunma Prefecture: Shigeo Kitano 
Hiroshima Prefecture: Hiroo Ōhara 
Hokkaido: Toshifumi Tanaka 
Hyogo Prefecture: Masaru Sakamoto 
Ibaraki Prefecture: Yoji Tomosue 
Ishikawa Prefecture: Wakio Shibano 
Iwate Prefecture: Kenkichi Kokubun 
Kagawa Prefecture: Masanori Kaneko 
Kagoshima Prefecture: Katsushi Terazono 
Kanagawa Prefecture: Iwataro Uchiyama 
Kochi Prefecture: Wakaji Kawamura 
Kumamoto Prefecture: Saburō Sakurai 
Kyoto Prefecture: Torazō Ninagawa 
Mie Prefecture: Masaru Aoki 
Miyagi Prefecture: Otogorō Miyagi 
Miyazaki Prefecture: Nagashige Tanaka 
Nagano Prefecture: Torao Hayashi 
Nagasaki Prefecture: Takejirō Nishioka 
Nara Prefecture: Ryozo Okuda 
Niigata Prefecture: Shohei Okada 
Oita Prefecture: Tokuju Hosoda 
Okayama Prefecture: Yukiharu Miki 
Osaka Prefecture: Bunzō Akama 
Saga Prefecture: Naotsugu Nabeshima 
Saitama Prefecture: Yuuichi Oosawa 
Shiga Prefecture: Kotaro Mori 
Shiname Prefecture: Yasuo Tsunematsu 
Shizuoka Prefecture: Toshio Saitō 
Tochigi Prefecture: Aiji Nishio (until 7 November); Juukichi Kodaira (starting 7 November)
Tokushima Prefecture: Kuniichi Abe 
Tokyo: Seiichirō Yasui 
Tottori Prefecture: Shigeru Endo 
Toyama Prefecture: Kunitake Takatsuji 
Wakayama Prefecture: Shinji Ono 
Yamagata Prefecture: Michio Murayama 
Yamaguchi Prefecture: Taro Ozawa 
Yamanashi Prefecture: Hisashi Amano

Events
January 2 - A stampede occurs in Nijubashi, Imperial Square, Tokyo, with 16 fatalities, according to Japan National Police Agency confirmed report.:ja:二重橋事件 
January 18 – Mabuchi Motor was founded in Matsudo, Chiba Prefecture. 
February 1 – A first issue of Chūnichi Sports was published in Nagoya. 
April 26 - Akira Kurosawa's  Seven Samurai released in Japan.
July 1 - The Japanese Self-Defense Forces are established.
September 26
 A typhoon in the Tsugaru Strait sinks the ferry Tōya Maru, killing over 1,100 passengers and crew, wrecks at least seven other ships and seriously damages nine more.
 A massive fire in Iwanai, Hokkaido, a result of Typhoon Marie, leaves 38 people dead, 551 people injured according to Japan Fire and Disaster Management Agency official confirmed report.:ja:岩内大火  
October 8 - A sightseeing boat Uchigo Maru capsized due to overcrowding in Lake Sagami, Kanagawa Prefecture, 22 junior high school students perished, according to Japanese government confirmed report.
November 3 - Godzilla released in Japan.

Births
 January 6 - Yuji Horii, video game designer
 January 9 – Yasushi Tao, former professional baseball player and coach 
 January 14 - Masanobu Fuchi, professional wrestler
 January 19 - Yumi Matsutoya, singer
 January 28 - Kaneto Shiozawa, voice actor (d. 2000)
 January 29 - Yukinobu Hoshino, cartoonist
 February 4 - Shigeru Chiba, Voice actor and actor
 February 11 - Noriyuki Asakura, composer
 February 17 - Yuji Takada, free-style wrestler
 March 2 - Gara Takashima, voice actress
 March 23 - Hideyuki Hori, voice actor
 March 26 - Kazuhiko Inoue, voice actor
 April 2 -  Susumu Hirasawa, musician
 April 17 - Norio Imamura, voice actor
 April 22 - Jōji Nakata, voice actor
 April 29 - Kazuko Kurosawa, costume designer
 May 19 - Hōchū Ōtsuka, voice actor
 May 22 - Shuji Nakamura, electronics engineer
 June 2 - Chiyoko Kawashima, voice actress
 June 4 - Kazuhiro Yamaji, actor and voice actor
 July 10 - Yō Yoshimura, voice actor
 July 2 - Saori Minami, idol and singer
 August 1 - Junpei Morita, actor and voice actor
 September 16 - Masahiro Andoh, musician, guitarist of T-Square (band)
 September 21 - Shinzō Abe, Prime Minister of Japan (d. 2022)
 October 18 - Yūji Mitsuya, voice actor
 November 8 - Kazuo Ishiguro, author
 November 20 - Bin Shimada, voice actor

Deaths
 July 28 - Sōjin Kamiyama, film star during the silent film era (b. 1884)
 September 21 - Mikimoto Kōkichi, pearl farm pioneer (b. 1858)
 October 6 - Yukio Ozaki, politician (b. 1859)

See also
 List of Japanese films of 1954

References

 
Years of the 20th century in Japan
Japan
1950s in Japan